Megachile edwardsiana is a species of bee in the family Megachilidae. It was described by Friese in 1925.

References

Edwardsiana
Insects described in 1925